Saleh Nikbakht is an Iranian lawyer and academic. He is the spokesman for the Society of Political Prisoners in Iran.

Nikbakht studied law and hold a doctoral degree from Tehran University. Nikbakht was involved in controversial cases including Hashem Aghajari, Abbas Abdi, Emad Baghi and 2009 presidential election detainees. Nikbakht is representing former deputy foreign minister Mohsen Aminzadeh, ex-government spokesman Abdollah Ramezanzadeh, former deputy economy minister Mohsen Safai-Farahani and former vice-president Mohammad Ali Abtahi.

References

See also
Defenders of Human Rights Center

21st-century Iranian lawyers
Iranian democracy activists
Living people
Kurdish United Front politicians
Year of birth missing (living people)
Iranian Kurdish people
People from Saghez